Dombeya aethiopica is a species of flowering plant in the Malvaceae family. It is found only in Ethiopia.

References

aethiopica
Endemic flora of Ethiopia
Near threatened plants
Taxonomy articles created by Polbot